Norma Lerner (nee Wolkoff, born 1935/36) is an American billionaire, the widow of Al Lerner, who was the founder of the credit card company MBNA. As of May 2022, her net worth was estimated at US$1.1 billion.

Early life
She was born Norma Wolkoff, and married Al Lerner in 1955.

Career
From 2006 to 2011, she was a member of the United States Holocaust Memorial Council, and a member of its executive committee.

She is chair and president of the Lerner Foundation, director of the Cleveland Clinic, co-founder of the Lerner Research Institute, and founder of the Cleveland Clinic Lerner School of Medicine at Case Western Reserve University.

Personal life
In 1955, she married Al Lerner.  They were married for 47 years and had two children, business executive Randy Lerner, and Nancy Lerner. The Lerners were members of Temple Tifereth-Israel in Cleveland. Lerner is widowed, and lives in Cleveland, Ohio.

References

1930s births
Living people
American billionaires
20th-century American Jews
American businesspeople
People from Cleveland
Lerner family
21st-century American Jews